Carmen Ghiciuc (born 10 May 2001) is a Romanian artistic gymnast. She won the bronze medal with the Romanian team at the 2016 European Women's Artistic Gymnastics Championships.

Competitive History

Junior

Senior

References

Living people
Romanian female artistic gymnasts
2001 births
21st-century Romanian women